Indra III (reigned 914–929 CE) was the grandson of Rashtrakuta Krishna II and son of Chedi princess Lakshmi. He became the ruler of the empire due to the early demise of his father Jagattunga. He had many titles such as Nithyavarsha, Rattakandarapa, Rajamarathanda and Kirthinarayana. He patronised Kannada poet and commander SriVijaya and Sanskrit poet Trivikrama. Indra III was married to princess Vijamba of the Kalachuri dynasty of central India (Chedi).

Capture of Kannauj
Immediately after coming to power, Indra III had to fight a Paramara ruler, a feudatory of Gurjara-Pratihara and routed him out of Govardhana near Nasik. Thereafter the Paramaras became feudatories of the Rashtrakutas. The Gurjara Pratihara ruler Mahendrapala I was experiencing some family feuds and this gave Indra III an opportunity to attack Kannauj in the Ganges - Yamuna doab. Kannauj at this time was under the control of the Pratihara empire. From the writings of Kannada poet Adikavi Pampa it is known that Indra III sent his feudatory, Chalukya king Narasimha II of Vemulavada, in pursuit of Mahipala I the incumbent ruler who fled the area.   Kannauj was "completely destroyed", and the Pratihara ruler weakened. The northern campaign of Indra III produced more dramatic results then during the rule of Dhruva Dharavarsha and Govinda III as the Rashtrakutas were actually able to hold Kannauj until c.916.

Trouble in Vengi
A civil war like situation prevailed in Vengi after the defeat of Eastern Chalukya Bhima at the hands of Baddega, a Rashtrakuta feudatory from Vemulavada. A period of intense politics continued when the Rashtrakutas tried to install the king of their choice in Vengi. Indra III's Jain general Sri Vijaya (who was also a poet) won may wars for his king in the eastern Deccan and the bulk of Vengi was brought under the rule of Indra III for a few years.

Notes

References

External links
History of Karnataka, Mr. Arthikaje

Hindu monarchs
10th-century rulers in Asia
Rashtrakuta dynasty
929 deaths
Year of birth unknown